Steffen Iversen (born 10 November 1976) is a Norwegian footballer who is player-manager for Norwegian 4th division side Trygg/Lade as a striker. He is the son of former Norway international Odd Iversen, one of Norway's most prolific goalscorers of all time.

Iversen began his career as an 18-year-old at Rosenborg where he won two consecutive Norwegian league championships. He moved to Tottenham Hotspur in December 1996, where he scored 54 goals in seven years, and won the League Cup. After a brief spell at Wolverhampton Wanderers, he moved back to his native Norway where he spent two years at Vålerenga and was a contributing factor to Vålerenga's first league championship in 21 years. In 2006, he moved back to Rosenborg, where he won his second consecutive league title, and after another league victory in 2010, Iversen spent 13 months at Crystal Palace, before he signed for Rosenborg for the third time in February 2012.

Iversen was capped 79 times for the national team, scoring 21 goals. He scored Norway's only goal in a UEFA European Football Championship when he scored the match-winning goal against Spain in the group stage of UEFA Euro 2000.

Club career

Early career
Steffen Iversen was born in Oslo, when his father, Odd Iversen, was playing for Vålerenga. His family moved back to Trondheim when he was three years old, and the first club that Iversen played for was his father's club Rosenborg. He signed for Nationalkameratene at the age of seven, and the contract, dated 16 February 1984, included a clause that stated that Steffen Iversen any time could move back to Rosenborg free of charge, and was signed by his father. He later moved on to Astor before he joined Rosenborg's youth department in 1994, where he scored six goals in his debut for the reserve team.

He joined Rosenborg's first team squad in 1995, and made his debut in the first match of the season against Kongsvinger at Lerkendal on 21 April 1995. During the two season he first played at Rosenborg, he scored 18 goals in 50 matches, won two consecutive league championship and played in the Champions League. His last match in his first period for Rosenborg was the famous win against Milan at San Siro.

Tottenham Hotspur and Wolverhampton Wanderers
In December 1996, he joined Tottenham Hotspur for a fee of £2.3 million, and made his Premier League debut against Coventry City, four days after his last match for Rosenborg. He spent seven years at White Hart Lane – collecting a League Cup winners' medal in 1999, assisting Allan Nielsen's stoppage time winner. He also scored the winning goal in the semi-final against Wimbledon. He became the top scorer for the club in the 1998–99 and 1999–2000 season with 13 and 17 goals respectively. Ahead of the 2003–04 season, he signed a one-year contract with Wolverhampton Wanderers, after a long time with injury problems. He scored Wolves first ever Premier League goal but was not prolific only scoring 4 in 18 outings

Vålerenga and return to Rosenborg
In 2004, he moved back to Norway to play for Vålerenga where he played a crucial role during the 2005 season and won his third Tippeligaen, ten years after his first. His contract ended on 31 October 2005, and for months he was a free agent. Rumours abounded of several clubs showing their interest, including Mallorca, Everton and his previous club Vålerenga. On 10 February 2006 it was, a bit surprisingly, announced that he wanted to return to his old club Rosenborg, where his joining was officially announced on 13 February 2006. In Rosenborg Iversen was the star player and Rosenborg's topscorer (18 goals) of the 2006/07 season and helped his team win the title, Iversen's fourth medal.

When the transfer market was about to open again in the winter, the Belgian club K.R.C. Genk showed a great interest to buy him. A clause in his contract allowed him to leave the club if the new deal was signed before new year. After a lot of speculations and rumors, Iversen announced that he was staying in Rosenborg to Genk's dismay and disappointment.

Crystal Palace
He was linked to a number of English Championship clubs in the summer of 2010; including Crystal Palace, Norwich City and Ipswich Town, before provisionally signing for Crystal Palace on 1 January 2011. In his debut match for Crystal Palace, he scored against Preston after 58 minutes, giving Palace their first win in five matches. He scored two goals in 19 matches during the 13 months he played for the Eagles, before he was released by the club on 31 January 2012.

Third spell at Rosenborg
Iversen joined Rosenborg for the third time in his career on 15 February 2012. He signed a performance-based one-year contract, with an option for one more year, and stated that he had returned to win the league. In November 2012 he decided to retire from football.

Trygg/Lade
Iversen joined lower division club Trygg/Lade as a player-manager in 2018. On 19 April 2018, he managed his team in a 2–4 defeat against his former club Rosenborg in the 2018 Norwegian Football Cup.

International career
Iversen was a regular for the Norway U-21 and was a major contributor for the team that earned a third place in the 1998 UEFA U-21 Championship, by scoring Norway's all three goals during the championship, including two goals in the third-place match against Netherlands U-21. In total, he played 23 matches for the U-21 team, and scored 17 goals, a record.

Later the same year, he made his debut for the senior team in the UEFA Euro 2000 qualifier against Albania. He scored his first international goal on 20 May 1999 in the friendly match against Jamaica, a game Norway won 6–0.

In Norway's first match in a UEFA European Championship, Iversen scored the match-winning goal against Spain with a header. Iversen's goal is still Norway's only goal in a UEFA European Football Championship.

Iversen played regularly for the national team, until he in August 2008 overslept to a meeting with the squad that was to play a friendly match against Republic of Ireland on 20 August 2008 and was sent home by the national team coach Åge Hareide. Nevertheless, Iversen was called up for the next squad for the 2010 FIFA World Cup qualifier against Iceland where he scored Norway's two goals.

The UEFA Euro 2012 qualifier match against Denmark on 26 March 2011 was to be his last match for Norway. In total he achieved 79 caps – scoring 21 goals.

Agent
His agent while at Tottenham and Wolves was Christian Eidem.

Personal life
Iversen was married to Anna Crane.

Career statistics

Club

International

Scores and results list Norway's goal tally first, score column indicates score after each Iversen goal.

Honours

Rosenborg
Tippeligaen: 1995, 1996, 2006, 2009, 2010
Norwegian Football Cup: 1995

Tottenham Hotspur
League Cup: 1998–99; runner-up: 2001–02

Vålerenga
Tippeligaen: 2005

Individual
Tippeligaen Player of the Year: 2006
Kniksen Award Striker of the Year: 2006
Tippeligaen Player of the Month: September 2006
Norwegian Football Association Gold Watch

References

External links

Premier League profile

Rosenborg Player profile at RBKweb 

Living people
1976 births
Footballers from Trondheim
Association football forwards
Norwegian footballers
Norway international footballers
Norway youth international footballers
Norway under-21 international footballers
Vålerenga Fotball players
Rosenborg BK players
Tottenham Hotspur F.C. players
Wolverhampton Wanderers F.C. players
Crystal Palace F.C. players
UEFA Euro 2000 players
Eliteserien players
Premier League players
English Football League players
Kniksen Award winners
Norwegian expatriate sportspeople in England
Expatriate footballers in England